John Bernard Delany (August 9, 1864 – June 11, 1906) was an American prelate of the Roman Catholic Church.  He served as bishop of the Diocese of Manchester in New Hampshire from 1904 to 1906.

Biography

Early life 
John Delany was born on August 9, 1864 in Lowell, Massachusetts to Thomas Delany and Catherine Fox Delany, both Irish immigrants. As a young man, he studied the classics and philosophy for two years at the College of the Holy Cross in Worcester, Massachusetts. He then entered Boston College, graduating in June 1887. His classmates remembered him as being a deep thinker, a good friend and a ready piano player for musical events. 

After his graduation, Delany met with Bishop Denis Bradley and asked to be part of the new Diocese of New Hampshire.  At Bradley's suggestion, Delany went to Paris in 1887 to study for the priesthood at the Seminary of Saint-Sulpice in Paris.

Priesthood 
Delany was ordained to the priesthood for the Diocese of Manchester in Rome by Cardinal François-Marie-Benjamin Richard on May 23, 1891. When asked by his peers why Delany wanted to serve in a new, poor parish, he replied: "I am not to be a priest for what I can get out of it, but for what I can put into it.  I go to New Hampshire."

Following his return to New Hampshire in 1891, Delany was appointed as curate at St. Anne's Parish in Manchester.  After two and a half years, he was transferred to Immaculate Conception Parish in Portsmouth. According to contemporary accounts, he was a frequent visitor to the sick in the hospitals.  On several occasions, he paid out of his own pocket for children to see medical specialists in Boston.  He was respectful of others and made many friendships with non-Catholics. 

In 1898, Delany became chancellor of the diocese and secretary to Bishop Denis Bradley. Delany was founder and editor of the diocesan newspaper The Guidon.  When the Sisters of the Sacred Blood moved into the diocese, he was appointed as their chaplain.  Delany also served as state chaplain for the Knights of Columbus and director of the Priests Temperance League.  When a railroad was being constructed in the diocese, Delany visited the workers, many of whom were Catholic, in their camp.  In September 1902, he accompanied other clergy on a mission trip to Havana, Cuba.

Bishop of Manchester 
On April 18, 1904, Delany was appointed as the second bishop of the Diocese of Manchester by Pope Pius X. He received his episcopal consecration on September 8, 1904, from Archbishop Diomede Falconio, with Bishops William O'Connell and Edward Allen serving as co-consecrators, at St. Joseph's Cathedral. 

John Delany died at Sacred Heart Hospital in Manchester after an appendicitis, on June 11, 1906 at age 41.  His tenure as bishop lasted only 21 months.

References

1864 births
1906 deaths
College of the Holy Cross alumni
Boston College alumni
Seminary of Saint-Sulpice (France) alumni
Politicians from Lowell, Massachusetts
Roman Catholic bishops of Manchester
20th-century Roman Catholic bishops in the United States
Catholics from Massachusetts
19th-century American Roman Catholic priests